Martin Erik Andersen (born 1964) is a Danish sculptor who also works with drawings, textiles and sound. A former professor at the Royal Danish Academy of Fine Arts, he was a recipient of the Thorvaldsen Medal in 2014.

Biography
Andersen lives and works in Copenhagen. He studied at the Royal Danish Academy of Fine Arts (1985–92) and also in Cairo. 2009-2018 he was a professor at the Academy's department of sculpture. He has been involved in a sexual harassment case at the academy and has been fired from his position in 2018. His installations draw on a variety of techniques and materials including textiles, creations on paper, video, sound and light as well as scaffolding, plants and polyester. They attract the viewer, providing a new perspective of familiar objects.

His Freud's Gashgai (2011) in Statens Museum for Kunst is inspired by the rug on Sigmund Freud's couch which is now presented as a sculpted polyester relief. Like his other works, there is a relationship between the two-dimensional (the rug) and the three-dimensional (when spread over the couch) as well as between image and object.

Other notable installations include Kingdom of dirt, a complex set of symmetric patterns on a concrete floor mosaic, and More give me more give me more — dette dit dørtrin, a huge upright purple carpet hanging on a steel frame representing a contemporary paraphrase of the Ardabil Carpet. It was on the basis of these pieces that he was awarded the Thorvaldsen Medal.

Awards
In 2004, Andersen was awarded the Eckersberg Medal and, in 2014, the Thorvaldsen Medal.

References

External links
 Works by Martin Erik Andersen from his own website

1964 births
Danish sculptors
Danish male artists
Living people
Artists from Copenhagen
Recipients of the Thorvaldsen Medal
Recipients of the Eckersberg Medal
Male sculptors